Nannini may refer to:
Aldo Nannini, Grand Prix motorcycle road racer from Venezuela
Alessandro Nannini (born 1959), former racing driver from Italy
Andrea Nannini (born 1944), Italian volleyball player
Gianna Nannini (born 1954), Italian female singer-songwriter and Pop musician
Orlando Nannini (born 1930), Argentine fencer

See also
Aria (Gianna Nannini album), the seventeenth album released by Gianna Nannini in 2002
California (Gianna Nannini album), the third album by Gianna Nannini and was released in 1979
Gianna Nannini (album), the first album released by Gianna Nannini in 1976
Puzzle (Gianna Nannini album), the sixth album by Gianna Nannini and was released in 1984

es:Nannini
lv:Nannini